Haláčovce is a village and municipality in Bánovce nad Bebravou District in the Trenčín Region of north-western Slovakia.

History
In historical records the village was first mentioned in 1407.

Geography
The municipality lies at an altitude of 220 metres and covers an area of 4.694 km². It has a population of about 325.

Genealogical resources

The records for genealogical research are available at the state archive "Statny Archiv in Nitra, Slovakia"

 Roman Catholic church records (births/marriages/deaths): 1750-1895 (parish B)
 Lutheran church records (births/marriages/deaths): 1729-1895 (parish B)

See also
 List of municipalities and towns in Slovakia

References

External links

  Official page
http://www.statistics.sk/mosmis/eng/run.html 
Surnames of living people in Halacovce

Villages and municipalities in Bánovce nad Bebravou District